Amick Ciani (born 1 December 1982) is a French retired footballer.

Career

Scotland

Handed a contract with Ross County over the course of August 2006, Ciani debuted as the Staggies took on Forres Mechanics, forging a strike force with Alex Williams to overwhelm Gretna and progress to the semi-finals of the 2006–07 Scottish Challenge Cup, producing a goal of the season contender and a solid showing. Ross County went on to beat Clyde in the final.

According to Ross County coach Scott Leitch, the then 23-year old's deftness and skill with the ball stood out in training.

In 2010 he was on trial at St Mirren F.C.

Indonesia

On the radar of Persebaya Surabaya over the course of September 2011, Bajul Ijo were prepared to offer Rp 1.1 billion for the Frenchman, with coach Aji Santoso impressed by his footage. However, he and his agent cut back on the transfer, citing licensing reasons.

Belgium

Given a contract at KSK Ronse leading up to 2009/10, the RC Paris youth graduate contributed six goals that season, including one to get three points over Waasland-Beveren; he also chalked up a hat-trick during a friendly as Ronse dispatched SV Oudenaarde. Negotiating a deal with KAS Eupen a year later, the Parisian was not satisfied with his start with the Pandas, and picked up two yellow cards as they tied Lommel SK 2-2. He then ended up at Royale Union Saint-Gilloise, expressing confidence that Les Unionistes would be able to do well that season.

Cyprus

Snapped up by Doxa Katokopias before 2012/13, his only time on the scoresheet was a double as Doxa breezed past a youth selection 3-0 that October, moving on a few months later.

In 2014 he was on trial at Albanian side FK Partizani Tirana.

Honours
Ross County
Scottish Challenge Cup: 2006–07

References

External links 
 Έκλεισε Αμίκ και Λαζαρίδη η Δόξα Κρανούλας
 Les soirées contrastées de Romeo Debefve et Amick Ciani 
 
 Ross County Profile

1982 births
Sportspeople from Clichy, Hauts-de-Seine
Ross County F.C. players
Doxa Katokopias FC players
Royale Union Saint-Gilloise players
Living people
French footballers
Association football forwards
French expatriate footballers
Expatriate footballers in Scotland
Expatriate footballers in Belgium
Expatriate footballers in Greece
Expatriate footballers in Cyprus
Expatriate footballers in Indonesia
R. Charleroi S.C. players
UR La Louvière Centre players
K.S.K. Ronse players
Persebaya Surabaya players
K.A.S. Eupen players
Hereford United F.C. players
Expatriate footballers in England
Footballers from Hauts-de-Seine